Marcel Maes (19 December 1944 in Deurle – 10 April 1997 in Wondelgem) was a Belgian cyclist. He won the Peace Race in 1967. This was Maes's only professional victory. He rode in the 1968 Tour de France, finishing in 49th place.

References

1944 births
1997 deaths
Belgian male cyclists
Cyclists from East Flanders
People from Sint-Martens-Latem
20th-century Belgian people